Borbo kaka is a butterfly in the family Hesperiidae. It is found in Uganda and western Kenya.

References

Butterflies described in 1938
Hesperiinae